Yan Yiming (born 4 February 1998) is a Chinese footballer currently playing as a forward for Zibo Cuju.

Club career

Early career
Yan took an interest in sports as a child, with his father enrolling him in martial arts classes at the age of three, before joining the academy of professional football team Beijing Guoan in 2006. Three years later, he was admitted to the High School Affiliated to Renmin University of China football team, having stood out at trials of over 400 other players.

Move to Europe
In 2012, Yan proposed pursuing a footballing career in Europe to his father. His father was initially hesitant, but in August of the same year, Yan moved to Spain, finding a personal football coach who got him in touch with professional side Villarreal. Following a trial with Villarreal, the club asked him to stay longer, and Yan's father moved from Beijing to help support his son's career in Spain.

His first official club in Spain was Atlético Madrid, where he spent the 2013–14 season. He also played for Torre Levante and Cornellà, before joining then-La Liga side Deportivo Alavés in 2017. While at Deportivo Alavés, he was loaned out to lower division sides San Ignacio and Parla. Following his departure from Deportivo Alavés, he joined Atlético Saguntino on a permanent deal in November 2019. He was named on the bench three times for Atlético Saguntino, but did not make an appearance for the club.

Return to China
Yan returned to China in 2020, joining China League One side Taizhou Yuanda, but did not make an appearance for the club.

Career statistics

Club
.

References

1998 births
Living people
Chinese footballers
China youth international footballers
Association football forwards
Tercera División players
China League One players
Beijing Guoan F.C. players
Atlético Madrid footballers
UE Cornellà players
Deportivo Alavés players
Deportivo Alavés B players
Atlético Saguntino players
Taizhou Yuanda F.C. players
Zibo Cuju F.C. players
Chinese expatriate footballers
Chinese expatriate sportspeople in Spain
Expatriate footballers in Spain